Gadget Flow (also known as The Gadget Flow) is a New York City-based curated e-commerce marketplace launched in 2012 in Greece by Evan Varsamis, Cassie Ousta, and Mike Chliounakis. At 22 million visits per month it is among the largest product-search engines with an emphasis on researching products from Amazon, Etsy, Kickstarter, IndieGogo and other crowdfunding platforms.

History 

In 2012, Gadget Flow was founded in an apartment in Athens, Greece by college students Evan Varsamis, Cassie Ousta and Mike Chliounakis  as a design inspiration blog. Its first revenues came from banner advertising around published content on new products from Greek designers and artists on Amazon.com and Etsy. The team added a “buy now” button after each product review that took the visitor to the artisan's website.

In early 2013 the site's founders added digital advertising and social media services, but after seeing The Gadget Flow website traffic triple after a relaunch, they refocused on the core business. The company drew attention from its exhibitions at tech events and conferences, including Web Summit Dublin held in November 2014 and The Next Web Conference NYC held in November 2015.

In 2014 the site launched iOS and Android applications for product search;   product features include live video product reviews with interactive question-and-answer sessions.

The company launched The Gadget Flow Shop in August 2016.   

In 2018 Gadget Flow launched the first episode of its podcast about marketing, crowdfunding, and product placement.

Leadership 
Gadget Flow is managed by CEO Evan Varsamis.

Other key executives are:

 Cassie Ousta (Chief Commercial Officer)
 Mike Chliounakis (Chief Operating Officer)
 John Antoniou (Chief Technology Officer)

Products and services 
Gadget Flow assists customers to discover, buy and save on products. The company advertises brands and businesses to their targeting community.

As of 2017, Huffington Post reported that the site had featured over 6,000 products, with Gadget Flow topping its list of smart shopping apps.

In Fall 2017, news outlets reported that Gadget Flow enabled Apple's ARKit and simultaneous localization and mapping technology to show products in augmented reality.

Recognitions 
In October 2016 The Next Web named The Gadget Flow one of the most promising tech startups of 2016. 

In 2017 Entrepreneur magazine listed the site as a "secret weapon" to crowdfunding success.

Gadget Flow was named one of the "Best Entrepreneurial Companies in America" by Entrepreneur magazine's 2017 Entrepreneur 360 list.

References

External links
Official Website
Blog

American companies established in 2012
Retail companies established in 2012
Internet properties established in 2012
Online retailers of the United States
Companies based in New York City
Technology companies of the United States